Ioan Andone (born 15 March 1960) is a Romanian football coach and former player.

Club career
Ioan Andone, nicknamed "Fălcosul" was born on 15 March 1960 in Șpălnaca and when he was 14 years old he played basketball and football simultaneously, Carol Gal being his first football coach at Școala Sportivă Hunedoara, after which at 16 he decided to concentrate exclusively on his football career when he went at Corvinul Hunedoara's youth center where he was coached by Dumitru Pătrașcu. On 7 March 1979, Andone made his Divizia A debut for Corvinul when coach Mircea Lucescu sent him on the field in order to replace Radu Nunweiller in the last 20 minutes of a 2–0 away loss against Sportul Studențesc București. At the end of his first season spent at Corvinul, the club relegated to Divizia B, but Andone stayed with the club, promoting back to the first division after one year, helping the club finish 3rd in the 1981–82 Divizia A, also appearing in four games in which he scored two goals in the 1982–83 UEFA Cup. In the summer of 1983 Andone and teammate Mircea Rednic were transferred from Corvinul to Dinamo București in exchange for five players which included Nicușor Vlad, Teofil Stredie and Florea Văetuș. Andone spent a total of 7 seasons with The Red Dogs, winning the title in his first season with 3 goals scored in 27 appearances and in his last season with 20 appearances and two goals scored. During the same period, Andone also won three Cupa României and played 25 games in which he scored one goal in European competitions, appearing in 6 games in the 1983–84 European Cup season when the team reached the semi-finals and in 8 games in the 1989–90 UEFA Cup Winners' Cup campaign when the team also reached the semi-finals with his former Corvinul coach, Mircea Lucescu. Andone was in the center of a big scandal in the derby against Steaua from March 1989 which was lost with 2–1 after Gheorghe Hagi opened the score, Andone equalized for Dinamo and Gabi Balint scored the winning goal for Steaua in the last minute of the game, also referee Ion Crăciunescu eliminated Rodion Cămătaru and Claudiu Vaișcovici from Dinamo. Feeling that they were disadvantaged by the referee, right after the game Andone and Rednic showed some obscene gestures in front of the official tribune where Valentin Ceaușescu, the son of dictator Nicolae Ceaușescu and unofficial president of Steaua was staying. Initially, the Romanian Football Federation suspended Andone for one year, but after his friend from Steaua, Marius Lăcătuș talked to Valentin Ceaușescu and convinced him to forgive Andone, his suspension was reduced to three months, Rednic also got away with it after a friend of his from Steaua, László Bölöni talked to Valentin Ceaușescu. After the 1989 Romanian Revolution, he was bought by Spanish side Elche for 125.000$ where he was teammate with Santiago Cañizares and played 34 matches in which he scored scored 3 goals in the 1990–91 Segunda División season. Andone then went on to play for the last two seasons of his career in the Netherlands under head coach Fritz Korbach at Heerenveen in the Eerste Divisie, where he was also teammate with Rodion Cămătaru, appearing in 39 league games in which he scored 4 goals. Andone gained throughout his career a total of 255 Divizia A appearances with 35 goals scored and a total of 29 matches with 3 goals scored in European competitions.

International career
Ioan Andone played 55 matches and scored two goals at international level for Romania, making his debut on 11 November 1981 when coach Mircea Lucescu sent him on the field in the 82nd minute in order to replace Aurel Țicleanu in a 0–0 against Switzerland at the 1982 World Cup qualifiers. He made five appearances in which he scored one goal in a 2–0 victory against Sweden at the successful Euro 1984 qualifiers, being used by coach Mircea Lucescu in the 2–1 loss against West Germany at the final tournament as Romania did not pass the group stage. He played one game at the 1986 World Cup qualifiers, one at the Euro 1988 qualifiers and four at the successful 1990 World Cup qualifiers, being used by coach Emerich Jenei in all the minutes of the four matches from the final tournament, as Romania got eliminated by Ireland in the eight-finals. Ioan Andone's last game for the national team took place on 17 October 1990 in a 3–0 loss against Bulgaria at the Euro 1992 qualifiers. Andone was also part of Romania's U20 squad at the 1981 World Youth Championship from Australia, appearing in 5 games, helping the team finish the tournament in the 3rd position, winning the bronze medal.

For representing his country at the 1990 World Cup, Andone was decorated by President of Romania Traian Băsescu on 25 March 2008 with the Ordinul "Meritul Sportiv" – (The Medal "The Sportive Merit") class III.

International stats

International goals
Scores and results list Romania's goal tally first, score column indicates score after each Andone goal.

Managerial career
Ioan Andone started his coaching career in 1993 at Sportul Studențesc, a team he would coach on other three occasions. He coached Universitatea Cluj, Petrolul Ploiești, Farul Constanța, FC Brașov and Bihor Oradea before arriving in March 2003 at Dinamo București, a team with whom he won the first trophies of his coaching career consisting of a Divizia A title, three Cupa României and one Supercupa României, he would go on to have two more spells at Dinamo but without winning any trophies. At Dinamo he also made his first European performance by eliminating Everton with 5–2 on aggregate and reaching the group stage of the 2005–06 UEFA Cup. After he left Dinamo, Andone took over Cypriot club Omonia Nicosia in January 2006 and stayed there until January 2007, finishing on the second place in the 2005–06 Cypriot First Division. Andone coached CFR Cluj in the 2007–08 season, helping the team win the title and the cup, these being the first trophies the club won in its history, however he was dismissed in the beginning of the following season for poor results. He went to coach abroad, having spells in the Arab world at Al-Ettifaq and Al-Ahli, before returning to Europe at Bulgarian club CSKA Sofia where he worked with Romanian players Florentin Petre and Daniel Pancu. On 1 April 2010, Rapid București's officials appointed the former CSKA Sofia manager to lead the team until the end of the 2009–10 season. On 9 April 2012 he returned for a second spell at CFR Cluj, replacing Jorge Costa before the 26th round of the 2011–12 season, managing to win the title at the end of it and in the following season CFR eliminated Slovan Liberec and Basel in the 2012–13 Champions League campaign, thus reaching the group stage of the competition where after making 4 points in three games, Andone was dismissed. From 2013 until 2015, Andone coached abroad having two spells in Kazakhstan Premier League, the first with Astana in 2013 when he finished the championship on the second place, the second with Aktobe in 2015 when he finished the championship on the third place, also in between these two periods he had a second unsuccessful spell at Al-Ettifaq with whom he relegated from the Saudi Professional League and a spell in Cyprus at Apollon Limassol where he was dismissed while still being on the first place of the 2014–15 Cypriot First Division. From June 2018 until July 2021, Andone worked at Voluntari, first as general manager and from July 2020 as president. Ioan Andone has a total of 456 matches as a manager in the Romanian top-division, Liga I consisting of 207 victories, 80 draws and 169 losses.

Honours

Player
Corvinul Hunedoara
Divizia B: 1979–80
Dinamo București
Divizia A: 1983–84, 1989–90
Cupa României: 1983–84, 1985–86, 1989–90

Manager
Dinamo București
Divizia A: 2003–04
Cupa României: 2002–03, 2003–04, 2004–05
Supercupa României: 2005
CFR Cluj
Liga I: 2007–08, 2011–12
Cupa României: 2007–08

References

External links

1960 births
Living people
People from Alba County
Romanian footballers
Association football defenders
UEFA Euro 1984 players
1990 FIFA World Cup players
Liga I players
Liga II players
Segunda División players
Eerste Divisie players
FC Astana managers
CS Corvinul Hunedoara players
FC Dinamo București players
Elche CF players
SC Heerenveen players
Romania international footballers
Romania youth international footballers
Romanian football managers
FC Sportul Studențesc București managers
FC Bihor Oradea managers
FC Dinamo București managers
FC Universitatea Cluj managers
FC Petrolul Ploiești managers
FCV Farul Constanța managers
FC Brașov (1936) managers
AC Omonia managers
CFR Cluj managers
PFC CSKA Sofia managers
FC Rapid București managers
Ettifaq FC managers
Apollon Limassol FC managers
Saudi Professional League managers
Romanian expatriate footballers
Romanian expatriate football managers
Expatriate footballers in the Netherlands
Romanian expatriate sportspeople in the Netherlands
Expatriate footballers in Spain
Romanian expatriate sportspeople in Spain
Expatriate football managers in Cyprus
Romanian expatriate sportspeople in Cyprus
Expatriate football managers in Saudi Arabia
Romanian expatriate sportspeople in Saudi Arabia
Expatriate football managers in Kazakhstan
Expatriate football managers in the United Arab Emirates
Romanian expatriate sportspeople in the United Arab Emirates
Expatriate football managers in Bulgaria
Romanian expatriate sportspeople in Bulgaria